Knittelfeld is a city in Styria, Austria, located on the banks of the Mur river. 

The name of the town has become notorious for the Knittelfeld Putsch of September 7, 2002, a party meeting of the Freedom Party of Austria, which resulted in the 2002 Austrian elections.

Notable residents
The following are past and present notable residents of Knittelfeld.
 Klaus Ambrosch (*1973), decathlete
 Gert Hofbauer (*1937), musician and conductor
 Marcel Ritzmaier (*1993), football player
 Stefan Rucker (*1980), cyclist
 Andi Siebenhofer (*1977), extreme sports athlete and entrepreneur
 Karl Troll (1923–1977), politician
 Lizzi Waldmüller (1904–1945), actress
 Zoran Lerchbacher (*1972), darts player
 Hermann Lichtenegger (1900-1984), resistance fighter, politician, Under Secretary of State
 Harald Proczyk (*1975), racing driver

References

External links

Official website 
Pictures of and information about Knittelfeld in English

Cities and towns in Murtal District